John Aubyn may refer to:

John Aubyn, senior, MP for Reigate in January 1377, 1378 and October 1382
John Aubyn, junior, MP for Reigate in April 1384, 1385, 1386, September 1388, January 1390 and 1393

See also
John St Aubyn (disambiguation)